Pascoa was launched at Calcutta in 1816. She was a "country ship", trading around India and between India and China. She was a transport in 1819-20 during the British punitive campaign against the Al Qasimi pirates. She was lost in 1836.

Career
Eighteen transports, most of them merchant vessels registered at Bombay, carried troops and supplies. One of the transports was Pascoa, from Calcutta.

After destroying Ras al-Khaima, the British then spent the rest of December and early January moving up and down the coast destroying forts and vessels. The capture and destruction of the fortifications and ships in the port was a massive blow for the Gulf pirates. British casualties were minimal.

In 1827 Parsi merchants at Bombay purchased Pascoa. Her primary trade was carrying cotton from Bombay and Bengal to China.

Fate
In December 1836 Pascoa struck a rock outside the Romania Islands. She had been sailing from Singapore to China.

She began taking on water but was able to reach Singapore Roads where she sank in shoal water. All her cargo was retrieved, though most of it was damaged; the hull was left in place. In June 1845 Captain Faber used gunpowder to blow the hull to pieces as it had become a hazard to navigation.

Notes, citations, and references
Notes

Citations

References
  
  
 
 

1816 ships
British ships built in India
Age of Sail merchant ships of England
Maritime incidents in December 1836